Gonzalo Vásquez is a corregimiento in Chimán District, Panamá Province, Panama with a population of 91 as of 2010. Its population as of 1990 was 277; its population as of 2000 was 356.

References

Corregimientos of Panamá Province
Road-inaccessible communities of Panama